The discography of Japanese Shibuya-kei group Pizzicato Five includes 13 studio albums, one live album, one soundtrack album, 16 compilation albums, nine remix albums, six video albums, 13 extended plays and 22 singles.

Albums

Studio albums

Live albums

Soundtrack albums

Compilation albums

Remix albums

Video albums

Extended plays

Singles

Matador Records releases

Studio albums

Compilation albums

Remix albums

Extended plays

Singles

Other appearances

Notes

References

External links
 
 
 Pizzicato Five at Nippon Columbia 
 Pizzicato Five at Matador Records

Discographies of Japanese artists
Pop music group discographies